Turgutluspor is a Turkish sports club located in Turgutlu, Manisa Province. The football club currently plays in the TFF Third League.

External links
 Official website
 Turgutluspor on TFF.org

 
Sport in Manisa
Football clubs in Turkey
Association football clubs established in 1984
1984 establishments in Turkey
Turgutlu